Ahmed Ali Akbar is a Pakistani actor who primarily works in Urdu television. He marked his television debut at the age of thirteen in PTV's drama Stop Watch. He guest-starred in 2013 drama film Siyaah and started his professional acting career in 2014, since then he has appeared in several television series. Akbar is best known for playing the titular character Parizaad in Hum TV's popular Parizaad in 2021 for which he won several awards including Hum Awards for Best Actor - Popular. His other notable works include Ehd- E-Wafa, and Yeh Raha Dil.

Personal life 
Ahmed was born in Rawalpindi to Pakistani tennis coach Muhammad Ali Akbar. He played tennis on a national level before pursuing his film career. He also played cricket and football at club level. At one point he wanted to go into professional cricket but abandoned the option because of nepotism.

Career 
He marked his television career at the age of thirteen on PTV's drama Stop Watch, after which he was singing for a progressive rock band, the Islamabad-based  Nafs for some ten years before going back into acting on some friend's advice, in a play written by Osman Khalid Butt. Ali made his stage debut in 2008 and received critical appraisal for his work.

He guest starred in his 2013 debut film  Siyaah and started his professional television career in 2014, as a lead actor in the drama Shehr-e-Ajnabi.

He then grabbed one of the leading roles in Parchi, in 2018, which was well received at the box-office. He also directed the stunts for the film.

In 2019 he starred in Laal Kabootar, a crime-thriller movie set in Karachi, which is also music video director Kamal Khan's first feature film, sharing the screen with Mansha Pasha and Ali Kazmi, and which was well received by the critics.
In 2019 he also worked for drama serial Ehd-e-Wafa which was ISPR's presentation and aired on PTV Home and Hum TV

Filmography

Films

Television

Theatre

Accolades

References

External links 
 

Living people
1986 births
Pakistani male stage actors
Pakistani male film actors
Pakistani male television actors
Pakistani male singers
Pakistani television hosts
Male actors from Rawalpindi
People from Karachi
Punjabi people
Pakistani male tennis players
Male actors in Urdu cinema